Sunrise Beach Village is a city in Llano County, Texas, United States. The village was established in 1973. The population was 713 at the 2010 census.

Geography

Demographics

2020 census

At the 2020 United States census, there were 739 people, 445 households and 319 families residing in the city.

2000 census
At the 2000 census, there were 704 people, 354 households and 247 families residing in the city. The racial make-up of the city was 98.72% White, 0.28% African American, 0.14% Native American, 0.14% from other races and 0.71% from two or more races. Hispanic or Latino of any race were 1.14% of the population.

There were 354 households, of which 10.2% had children under the age of 18 living with them, 64.1% were married couples living together, 3.1% had a female householder with no husband present and 30.2% were non-families. 24.3% of all households were made up of individuals, and 13.3% had someone living alone who was 65 years of age or older. The average household size was 1.99 and the average family size was 2.30.

8.9% of the population were under the age of 18, 2.0% from 18 to 24, 14.2% from 25 to 44, 39.3% from 45 to 64 and 35.5% were 65 years of age or older. The median age was 59 years. For every 100 females, there were 93.4 males. For every 100 females age 18 and over, there were 91.3 males.

The median household income was $44,750 and the median family income was $51,776. Males had a median income of $34,531 and females $26,094. The per capita income was $29,433. About 5.1% of families and 5.8% of the population were below the poverty line, including 3.6% of those under age 18 and 8.7% of those age 65 or over.

Education
Sunrise Beach Village is served by the Llano Independent School District.

References

External links

 
 City website

Cities in Llano County, Texas
Cities in Texas
1973 establishments in Texas